Ericomyrtus drummondii is a shrub endemic to Western Australia.

It is found in the Great Southern, Wheatbelt and Goldfields-Esperance regions of Western Australia between Wongan Hills, Esperance and Albany.

References

Eudicots of Western Australia
drummondii
Endemic flora of Western Australia
Plants described in 1847
Taxa named by Nikolai Turczaninow